The Hospital Church of San Roque is a church in the city of Puebla's historic centre, in the Mexican state of Puebla.

References

External links

 

Defunct hospitals in Mexico
Historic centre of Puebla
Roman Catholic churches in Puebla (city)